Swara Mandal or Dance of the Wind is a 1997 Hindi drama, film co-written and directed by Rajan Khosa. It was his feature film debut. It starred Kitu Gidwani and Bhaveen Gosain in lead roles. The film was a co-production between five countries, including UK, Germany and India.

Synopsis
Pallavi (Kitu Gidwani), a budding Indian classical singer, is the daughter and student of celebrated classical singer, Karuna Devi (Kapila Vatsyayan). While she was still gaining her confidence, her mother dies suddenly; due this shock Pallavi loses not just her bearings, but also her voice. Subsequently, she also loses her career, her students, and her husband (Bhaveen Gosain).

It is only after she meets a young street urchin, Tara (Roshan Bano) and start teaching her, following the guru-shishya parampara (Master-student tradition) of Indian classical music, as her mother once did with her, does she begin to finds herself again, and also her voice.

Cast
 Kitu Gidwani as Pallavi Sehgal
 Bhaveen Gossain as Ranmal
 B.C. Sanyal as Munir Baba
 Roshan Bano as Tara
 Kapila Vatsyayan as Karuna Devi
 Vinod Nagpal as Mr Thakkar
 Punarnava Mehta as Shabda
 Ami Arora as Janaki
 Bhunvar Lal as Trader at the Market
 Ibrahim Ahmed as Monkey Man

Soundtrack
Noted Hindustani classical singer, Shubha Mudgal composed the music,  while playback was given by 'Shweta Jhaveri', Shanti Hirannand, and Brinda Roy Choudhuri. Other noted artists, who worked on soundtrack were, Sarangi performer, Ustad Sultan Khan, and noted flautist, Ronu Majumdar, and the film went on to win the 'Gold Plaque for Music' at the 1998 Chicago International Film Festival.

Reception
The film was premiered at the Critics' Week, at 1997 Venice Film Festival, and became India's official entry at the Karlovy Vary International Film Festival, Melbourne International Film Festival, Jerusalem Film Festival and International Film Festival of India (IFFI) in 1998. The film went on to win several national and international awards in the following years, as it was theatrically released in twenty five countries in 1998-2001  However, it was commercially released in India, only in February 2008.

Channel 4 reviewed the film as, "A celebration of the classical singing tradition set in contemporary New Delhi, Rajan Khosa's film captures the beauty of ancient Indian music and the culture from which it emanates."

Awards
 1997: London Film Festival: Audience Award
 1997: Festival of Three Continents: Audience Award.
 1997: Festival of Three Continents: Best Actress: Kitu Gidwani
 1998: Chicago International Film Festival: Gold Plaque, Best Music: Rajan Khosa
 1998: International Film Festival Rotterdam: Netpac Award 
 1998: British Asian Film Festival: Best Director: Rajan Khosa

References

External links
 

1997 films
1990s Hindi-language films
Films set in Delhi
Films about classical music and musicians
1997 directorial debut films